Agusta is an Italian manufacturer of helicopters and part of AgustaWestland.

Agusta is the Italian form of the name "Augusta" (though not necessarily a feminine name), and may also refer to:

Companies 
 AgustaWestland, a helicopter company
 Bell/Agusta Aerospace Company, joint venture between Bell Helicopter Textron company and Agusta (now AgustaWestland)
 MV Agusta, Italian motorcycle manufacturer

People with the surname 
 Giovanni Agusta (1879–1927), Italian engineer
 Domenico Agusta (1907-1971), Italian entrepreneur and son of Giovanni Agusta
 Rocky Agusta (born 1950), Italian racing driver

Other uses 
 Ágústa Eva Erlendsdóttir (born 1982), Icelandic singer and actress
 Agusta scandal, a 1988 Belgian corruption scandal over the purchase of Agusta helicopters

See also 
 Augusta (disambiguation)

Italian-language surnames